Miko Malkamäki is a Finnish professional ice hockey defenceman who currently plays for Ässät of the SM-liiga.

References

External links

Living people
Ässät players
1988 births
Finnish ice hockey defencemen
People from Kokkola
Sportspeople from Central Ostrobothnia